Jorge Ramírez may refer to:

 Jorge Ramírez (Uruguayan footballer) (born 1986), Uruguayan footballer
 Jorge Ramírez (Peruvian footballer, born 1955) , Peruvian footballer
 Jorge Ramírez (Peruvian footballer, born 1975), Peruvian footballer
 Jorge Ramírez Gallego (born 1940), Colombian footballer
 Jorge Carlos Ramírez Marín (born 1961), Mexican politician